Corizus is a genus of insects in the family Rhopalidae.

References

External links 
Biolib:Corizus Fallén, 1814

Rhopalini
Pentatomomorpha genera